Guru Rao Deshpande (1889–1982) was a singer from Karnataka, India. His father, Narayanrao Deshpande, was a Carnatic musician who planned for his son to become a lawyer. However, the young Gururao had exhibited an intense attraction for Hindustani classical music. His parents had him tutored by vocalists Dattopant Joshi and T. K.Pitre, when he was just ten years old.

Recognition 

Renowned musician Bhimsen Joshi did not hear Gururao Deshpande sing until the latter was well known. He then celebrated "Shastabdi Samaroh" for Gururao Deshpande on 14 April 1962, in Pune. During this function, guest of honour Krishna Rao described Deshpande’s music as the "finest of pearls strung together".

Gururao and literature 

He was versed both in Kannada and English and enjoyed reading both languages. He mastered Kumaravyasa Bharata and Lakshmish Bharata, the two great epics of Kannada literature. His innovation was to recite both these epics in Hindustani music Gamaka style, inspired by Bharat Bindurao.

He earned presenting the long discourses of Kumaravyasa and Lakshmisha Bharata. Throughout these Gamaka recitals across the State, Gururao was accompanied by  Betageri Krishna Sharma, who provided the 'Vyakhyana' (interpretation in prose). The Gamaka conference at Hubli crowned Gururao with the title 'Gamaka Gauri Shankara'. Gnyanpeeth poet D. R. Bendre kept close association with Gururao via discussions of Kannada literature. Gururao was equally proficient in English. He passed Inter Arts (a great feat) and admired Wordsworth, Milton and Shakespeare. Gururao studied astrology and practiced it for leisure.

Students

References

External links 

1889 births
1982 deaths
Hindustani singers
Gwalior gharana
20th-century Indian male singers
20th-century Indian singers